Florent is a personal name. It may also refer to:

Florent (restaurant), former diner in New York City
Florent-en-Argonne, commune in France

See also
Florentin
Florentine
Saint-Florent, Haute-Corse